AIX (Advanced Interactive eXecutive, pronounced , "ay-eye-ex") is a series of proprietary Unix operating systems developed and sold by IBM for several of its computer platforms.

Background 
Originally released for the IBM RT PC RISC workstation in 1986, AIX has supported a wide variety of hardware platforms, including the IBM RS/6000 series and later Power and PowerPC-based systems, IBM System i, System/370 mainframes, PS/2 personal computers, and the Apple Network Server. It is currently supported on IBM Power Systems alongside IBM i and Linux.

AIX is based on UNIX System V with 4.3BSD-compatible extensions. It is certified to the UNIX 03 and UNIX V7 marks of the Single UNIX Specification, beginning with AIX versions 5.3 and 7.2 TL5 respectively. Older versions were previously certified to the UNIX 95 and UNIX 98 marks.

AIX was the first operating system to have a journaling file system, and IBM has continuously enhanced the software with features such as processor, disk and network virtualization, dynamic hardware resource allocation (including fractional processor units), and reliability engineering ported from its mainframe designs.

History

Unix started life at AT&T's Bell Labs research center in the early 1970s, running on DEC minicomputers. By 1976, the operating system was in use at various academic institutions, including Princeton, where Tom Lyon and others ported it to the S/370, to run as a guest OS under VM/370. This port would later grow out to become UTS, a mainframe Unix offering by IBM's competitor Amdahl Corporation.
IBM's own involvement in Unix can be dated to 1979, when it assisted Bell Labs in doing its own Unix port to the 370 (to be used as a build host for the 5ESS switch's software). In the process, IBM made modifications to the TSS/370 hypervisor to better support Unix.

It took until 1985 for IBM to offer its own Unix on the S/370 platform, IX/370, which was developed by Interactive Systems Corporation and intended by IBM to compete with Amdahl UTS. The operating system offered special facilities for interoperating with PC/IX, Interactive/IBM's version of Unix for IBM PC compatible hardware, and was licensed at $10,000 per sixteen concurrent users.

AIX Version 1, introduced in 1986 for the IBM RT PC workstation, was based on UNIX System V Releases 1 and 2.  In developing AIX, IBM and Interactive Systems Corporation (whom IBM contracted) also incorporated source code from 4.2 and 4.3 BSD UNIX.

Among other variants, IBM later produced AIX Version 3 (also known as AIX/6000), based on System V Release 3, for their POWER-based RS/6000 platform. Since 1990, AIX has served as the primary operating system for the RS/6000 series (later renamed IBM eServer pSeries, then IBM System p, and now IBM Power Systems). AIX Version 4, introduced in 1994, added symmetric multiprocessing with the introduction of the first RS/6000 SMP servers and continued to evolve through the 1990s, culminating with AIX 4.3.3 in 1999. Version 4.1, in a slightly modified form, was also the standard operating system for the Apple Network Server systems sold by Apple Computer to complement the Macintosh line.

In the late 1990s, under Project Monterey, IBM and the Santa Cruz Operation planned to integrate AIX and UnixWare into a single 32-bit/64-bit multiplatform UNIX with particular emphasis on running on Intel IA-64 (Itanium) architecture CPUs.  A beta test version of AIX 5L for IA-64 systems was released, but according to documents released in the SCO v. IBM lawsuit, less than forty licenses for the finished Monterey Unix were ever sold before the project was terminated in 2002. In 2003, the SCO Group alleged that (among other infractions) IBM had misappropriated licensed source code from UNIX System V Release 4 for incorporation into AIX; SCO subsequently withdrew IBM's license to develop and distribute AIX.  IBM maintains that their license was irrevocable, and continued to sell and support the product until the litigation was adjudicated.

AIX was a component of the 2003 SCO v. IBM lawsuit, in which the SCO Group filed a lawsuit against IBM, alleging IBM contributed SCO's intellectual property to the Linux codebase.  The SCO Group, who argued they were the rightful owners of the copyrights covering the Unix operating system, attempted to revoke IBM's license to sell or distribute the AIX operating system.  In March 2010, a jury returned a verdict finding that Novell, not the SCO Group, owns the rights to Unix.

AIX 6 was announced in May 2007, and it ran as an open beta from June 2007 until the general availability (GA) of AIX 6.1 on November 9, 2007.  Major new features in AIX 6.1 included full role-based access control, workload partitions (which enable application mobility), enhanced security (Addition of AES encryption type for NFS v3 and v4), and Live Partition Mobility on the POWER6 hardware.

AIX 7.1 was announced in April 2010, and an open beta ran until general availability of AIX 7.1 in September 2010. Several new features, including better scalability, enhanced clustering and management capabilities were added. AIX 7.1 includes a new built-in clustering capability called Cluster Aware AIX. AIX is able to organize multiple LPARs through the multipath communications channel to neighboring CPUs, enabling very high-speed communication between processors. This enables multi-terabyte memory address range and page table access to support global petabyte shared memory space for AIX POWER7 clusters so that software developers can program a cluster as if it were a single system, without using message passing (i.e. semaphore-controlled Inter-process Communication). AIX administrators can use this new capability to cluster a pool of AIX nodes. By default, AIX V7.1 pins kernel memory and includes support to allow applications to pin their kernel stack. Pinning kernel memory and the kernel stack for applications with real-time requirements can provide performance improvements by ensuring that the kernel memory and kernel stack for an application is not paged out.

AIX 7.2 was announced in October 2015, and released in December 2015. The principal feature of AIX 7.2 is the Live Kernel Update capability, which allows OS fixes to replace the entire AIX kernel with no impact to applications, by live migrating workloads to a temporary surrogate AIX OS partition while the original OS partition is patched. AIX 7.2 was also restructured to remove obsolete components. The networking component, bos.net.tcp.client was repackaged to allow additional installation flexibility. Unlike AIX 7.1, AIX 7.2 is only supported on systems based on POWER7 or later processors.

In January 2023, IBM moved development of AIX to its Indian subsidiary.

Supported hardware platforms

IBM RT PC
The original AIX (sometimes called AIX/RT) was developed for the IBM RT PC workstation by IBM in conjunction with Interactive Systems Corporation, who had previously ported UNIX System III to the IBM PC for IBM as PC/IX. According to its developers, the AIX source (for this initial version) consisted of one million lines of code. Installation media consisted of eight 1.2M floppy disks.  The RT was based on the IBM ROMP microprocessor, the first commercial RISC chip. This was based on a design pioneered at IBM Research (the IBM 801).

One of the novel aspects of the RT design was the use of a microkernel, called Virtual Resource Manager (VRM).  The keyboard, mouse, display, disk drives and network were all controlled by a microkernel.  One could "hotkey" from one operating system to the next using the Alt-Tab key combination. Each OS in turn would get possession of the keyboard, mouse and display. Besides AIX v2, the PICK OS also included this microkernel.

Much of the AIX v2 kernel was written in the PL/8 programming language, which proved troublesome during the migration to AIX v3. AIX v2 included full TCP/IP networking, as well as SNA and two networking file systems: NFS, licensed from Sun Microsystems, and Distributed Services (DS). For the graphical user interfaces, AIX v2 came with the X10R3 and later the X10R4 and X11 versions of the X Window System from MIT, together with the Athena widget set. Compilers for Fortran and C were available.

IBM PS/2 series

AIX PS/2 (also known as AIX/386) was developed by Locus Computing Corporation under contract to IBM. AIX PS/2, first released in October 1988, ran on IBM PS/2 personal computers with Intel 386 and compatible processors.

The product was announced in September 1988 with a baseline tag price of $595, although some utilities like uucp were included in a separate Extension package priced at $250. nroff and troff for AIX were also sold separately in a Text Formatting System package priced at $200. The TCP/IP stack for AIX PS/2 retailed for another $300. The X Window System package was priced at $195, and featured a graphical environment called the AIXwindows Desktop, based on IXI's X.desktop. The C and FORTRAN compilers each had a price tag of $275. Locus also made available their DOS Merge virtual machine environment for AIX, which could run MS DOS 3.3 applications inside AIX; DOS Merge was sold separately for another $250. IBM also offered a $150 AIX PS/2 DOS Server Program, which provided file server and print server services for client computers running PC DOS 3.3.

The last version of PS/2 AIX is 1.3. It was released in 1992 and announced to add support for non-IBM (non-microchannel) computers as well. Support for PS/2 AIX ended in March 1995.

IBM mainframes
In 1988, IBM announced AIX/370, also developed by Locus Computing.  AIX/370 was IBM's fourth attempt to offer Unix-like functionality for their mainframe line, specifically the System/370 (the prior versions were a TSS/370-based Unix system developed jointly with AT&T c.1980, a VM/370-based system named VM/IX developed jointly with Interactive Systems Corporation c.1984, and a VM/370-based version of TSS/370 named IX/370 which was upgraded to be compatible with Unix System V).  AIX/370 was released in 1990 with functional equivalence to System V Release 2 and 4.3BSD as well as IBM enhancements.  With the introduction of the ESA/390 architecture, AIX/370 was replaced by AIX/ESA in 1991, which was based on OSF/1, and also ran on the System/390 platform.  This development effort was made partly to allow IBM to compete with Amdahl UTS.  Unlike AIX/370, AIX/ESA ran both natively as the host operating system, and as a guest under VM.  AIX/ESA, while technically advanced, had little commercial success, partially because UNIX functionality was added as an option to the existing mainframe operating system, MVS, as MVS/ESA SP Version 4 Release 3 OpenEdition in 1994, and continued as an integral part of MVS/ESA SP Version 5, OS/390 and z/OS, with the name eventually changing from OpenEdition to Unix System Services. IBM also provided OpenEdition in VM/ESA Version 2 through z/VM.

IA-64 systems
As part of Project Monterey, IBM released a beta test version of AIX 5L for the IA-64 (Itanium) architecture in 2001, but this never became an official product due to lack of interest.

Apple Network Servers
The Apple Network Server (ANS) systems were PowerPC-based systems designed by Apple Computer to have numerous high-end features that standard Apple hardware did not have, including swappable hard drives, redundant power supplies, and external monitoring capability. These systems were more or less based on the Power Macintosh hardware available at the time but were designed to use AIX (versions 4.1.4 or 4.1.5) as their native operating system in a specialized version specific to the ANS called AIX for Apple Network Servers.

AIX was only compatible with the Network Servers and was not ported to standard Power Macintosh hardware. It should not be confused with A/UX, Apple's earlier version of Unix for 68k-based Macintoshes.

POWER ISA/PowerPC/Power ISA-based systems

The release of AIX version 3 (sometimes called AIX/6000) coincided with the announcement of the first POWER1-based IBM RS/6000 models in 1990.

AIX v3 innovated in several ways on the software side. It was the first operating system to introduce the idea of a journaling file system, JFS, which allowed for fast boot times by avoiding the need to ensure the consistency of the file systems on disks (see fsck) on every reboot. Another innovation was shared libraries which avoid the need for static linking from an application to the libraries it used. The resulting smaller binaries used less of the hardware RAM to run, and used less disk space to install. Besides improving performance, it was a boon to developers: executable binaries could be in the tens of kilobytes instead of a megabyte for an executable statically linked to the C library. AIX v3 also scrapped the microkernel of AIX v2, a contentious move that resulted in v3 containing no PL/8 code and being somewhat more "pure" than v2.

Other notable subsystems included:

 IRIS GL, a 3D rendering library, the progenitor of OpenGL. IRIS GL was licensed by IBM from SGI in 1987, then still a fairly small company, which had sold only a few thousand machines at the time. SGI also provided the low-end graphics card for the RS/6000, capable of drawing 20,000 gouraud-shaded triangles per second. The high-end graphics card was designed by IBM, a follow-on to the mainframe-attached IBM 5080, capable of rendering 990,000 vectors per second.
 PHIGS, another 3D rendering API, popular in automotive CAD/CAM circles, and at the core of CATIA.
 Full implementation of version 11 of the X Window System, together with Motif as the recommended widget toolkit and window manager.
 Network file systems: NFS from Sun; AFS, the Andrew File System; and DFS, the Distributed File System.
 NCS, the Network Computing System, licensed from Apollo Computer (later acquired by HP).
 DPS on-screen display system. This was notable as a "plan B" in case the X11+Motif combination failed in the marketplace. However, it was highly proprietary, supported only by Sun, NeXT, and IBM. This cemented its failure in the marketplace in the face of the open systems challenge of X11+Motif and its lack of 3D capability.

In addition, AIX applications can run in the PASE subsystem under IBM i.

Source code 
IBM formerly made the AIX for RS/6000 source code available to customers for an additional fee; in 1991, IBM customers could order the AIX 3.0 source code for a one-time charge of US$60,000; subsequently, IBM released the AIX 3.1 source code in 1992,  and AIX 3.2 in 1993. These source code distributions excluded certain files (authored by third-parties) which IBM did not have rights to redistribute, and also excluded layered products such as the MS-DOS emulator and the C compiler. Furthermore, in order to be able to license the AIX source code, the customer first had to procure source code license agreements with AT&T and the University of California, Berkeley.

Versions

POWER/PowerPC/Power ISA releases

 AIX V7.3, December 10, 2021
 Requires POWER8 or newer CPUs
 AIX V7.2, October 5, 2015
 Live update for Interim Fixes, Service Packs and Technology Levels replaces the entire AIX kernel without impacting applications
 Flash based filesystem caching
 Cluster Aware AIX automation with repository replacement mechanism
 SRIOV-backed VNIC, or dedicated VNIC virtualized network adapter support 
 RDSv3 over RoCE adds support of the Oracle RDSv3 protocol over the Mellanox Connect RoCE adapters
 Supports secure boot on POWER9 systems.
 Requires POWER7 or newer CPUs
 AIX V7.1, September 10, 2010
 Support for 256 cores / 1024 threads in a single LPAR
 The ability to run AIX V5.2 or V5.3 inside of a Workload Partition
 An XML profile based system configuration management utility
 Support for export of Fibre Channel adapters to WPARs
 VIOS disk support in a WPAR
 Cluster Aware AIX
 AIX Event infrastructure
 Role-based access control (RBAC) with domain support for multi-tenant environments
 Requires POWER4 or newer CPUs
 AIX V6.1, November 9, 2007
 Workload Partitions (WPARs) operating system-level virtualization
 Live Application Mobility
 Live Partition Mobility
 Security
 Role Based Access Control RBAC
 AIX Security Expert a system and network security hardening tool
 Encrypting JFS2 filesystem
 Trusted AIX
 Trusted Execution
 Integrated Electronic Service Agent for auto error reporting
 Concurrent Kernel Maintenance
 Kernel exploitation of POWER6 storage keys
 ProbeVue dynamic tracing
 Systems Director Console for AIX
 Integrated filesystem snapshot
 Requires POWER4 or newer CPUs
 AIX 6 withdrawn from Marketing effective April 2016 and from Support effective April 2017
 AIX 5L 5.3, August 13, 2004, end of support April 30, 2012
 NFS Version 4
 Advanced Accounting
 Virtual SCSI
 Virtual Ethernet
 Exploitation of Simultaneous multithreading (SMT)
 Micro-Partitioning enablement
 POWER5 exploitation
 JFS2 quotas
 Ability to shrink a JFS2 filesystem
 Kernel scheduler has been enhanced to dynamically increase and decrease the use of virtual processors.
 AIX 5L 5.2, October 18, 2002, end of support April 30, 2009
 Ability to run on the IBM BladeCenter JS20 with the PowerPC 970
 Minimum level required for POWER5 hardware
 MPIO for Fibre Channel disks
 iSCSI Initiator software
 Participation in Dynamic LPAR
 Concurrent I/O (CIO) feature introduced for JFS2 released in Maintenance Level 01 in May 2003
 AIX 5L 5.1, May 4, 2001, end of support April 1, 2006
 Ability to run on an IA-64 architecture processor, although this never went beyond beta.
 Minimum level required for POWER4 hardware and the last release that worked on the Micro Channel architecture
 64-bit kernel, installed but not activated by default
 JFS2
 Ability to run in a Logical Partition on POWER4
 The L stands for Linux affinity
 Trusted Computing Base (TCB)
 Support for mirroring with striping
 AIX 4.3.3, September 17, 1999
 Online backup function
 Workload Manager (WLM)
 Introduction of topas utility
 AIX 4.3.2, October 23, 1998
 AIX 4.3.1, April 24, 1998
 First TCSEC security evaluation, completed December 18, 1998
 AIX 4.3, October 31, 1997
 Ability to run on 64-bit architecture CPUs
 IPv6
 Web-based System Manager
 AIX 4.2.1, April 25, 1997
 NFS Version 3
 Y2K-compliant 
 AIX 4.2, May 17, 1996
 AIX 4.1.5, November 8, 1996
 AIX 4.1.4, October 20, 1995
 AIX 4.1.3, July 7, 1995
 CDE 1.0 became the default GUI environment, replacing the AIXwindows Desktop.
 AIX 4.1.1, October 28, 1994
 AIX 4.1, August 12, 1994
 AIX Ultimedia Services introduced (multimedia drivers and applications)
 AIX 4.0, 1994
 Run on RS/6000 systems with PowerPC processors and PCI busses.
 AIX 3.2 1992
 AIX 3.1, (General Availability) February 1990
 Journaled File System (JFS) filesystem type
 AIXwindows Desktop (based on X.desktop from IXI Limited)
 AIX 3.0 1989 (Early Access) 
 LVM (Logical Volume Manager) was incorporated into OSF/1, and in 1995 for HP-UX, and the Linux LVM implementation is similar to the HP-UX LVM implementation.
 SMIT was introduced.

IBM System/370 releases
 AIX/370 Version 1 Release 1
 Announced March 15, 1988
 Available February 16, 1989
 Does not run in XA, ESA or z mode

 AIX/370 Version 1 Release 2.1
 Announced February 5, 1991
 Available February February 22, 1991
 Withdrawn December 31, 1992
 Does not run in XA, ESA or z mode

 AIX/ESA Version 2 Release 1
 Announced March 31, 1992
 Available June 26, 1992
 Withdrawn Jun 19, 1993
 Runs only in S/370-ESA mode
 AIX/ESA Version 2 Release 2
 Announced December 15, 1992
 Available February 26, 1993
 Withdrawn Jun 19, 1993
 Runs only in S/370-ESA mode

IBM PS/2 releases
 AIX PS/2 v1.3, October 1992
 Withdrawn from sale in US, March 1995
 Patches supporting IBM ThinkPad 750C family of notebook computers, 1994
 Patches supporting non PS/2 hardware and systems, 1993
 AIX PS/2 v1.2.1, May 1991
 AIX PS/2 v1.2, March 1990
 AIX PS/2 v1.1, March 1989

IBM RT releases
 AIX RT v2.2.1, March 1991
 AIX RT v2.2, March 1990
 AIX RT v2.1, March 1989
 X-Windows included on installation media 
 AIX RT v1.1, 1986
 AIX RT v1.0, 1985

User interfaces

The default shell was Bourne shell up to AIX version 3, but was changed to KornShell (ksh88) in version 4 for XPG4 and POSIX compliance.

Graphical
The Common Desktop Environment (CDE) is AIX's default graphical user interface. As part of Linux Affinity and the free AIX Toolbox for Linux Applications (ATLA), open-source KDE Plasma Workspaces and GNOME desktop are also available.

System Management Interface Tool

SMIT is the System Management Interface Tool for AIX. It allows a user to navigate a menu hierarchy of commands, rather than using the command line. Invocation is typically achieved with the command smit. Experienced system administrators make use of the F6 function key which generates the command line that SMIT will invoke to complete it.
SMIT also generates a log of commands that are performed in the smit.script file. The smit.script file automatically records the commands with the command flags and parameters used. The smit.script file can be used as an executable shell script to rerun system configuration tasks. SMIT also creates the smit.log file, which contains additional detailed information that can be used by programmers in extending the SMIT system.

smit and smitty refer to the same program, though smitty invokes the text-based version, while smit will invoke an X Window System based interface if possible; however, if smit determines that X Window System capabilities are not present, it will present the text-based version instead of failing.  Determination of X Window System capabilities is typically performed by checking for the existence of the DISPLAY variable.

Database
Object Data Manager (ODM) is a database of system information integrated into AIX, analogous to the registry in Microsoft Windows. A good understanding of the ODM is essential for managing AIX systems.

Data managed in ODM is stored and maintained as objects with associated attributes. Interaction with ODM is possible via application programming interface (API) library for programs, and command-line utilities such as odmshow, odmget, odmadd, odmchange and odmdelete for shell scripts and users.  SMIT and its associated AIX commands can also be used to query and modify information in the ODM. ODM is stored on disk using Berkeley DB files.

Example of information stored in the ODM database are:
Network configuration
Logical volume management configuration
Installed software information
Information for logical devices or software drivers
List of all AIX supported devices
Physical hardware devices installed and their configuration
Menus, screens and commands that SMIT uses

See also
 AOS, IBM's educational-market port of 4.3BSD
 IBM PowerHA SystemMirror (formerly HACMP)
 List of Unix systems
 nmon
 Operating systems timeline
 Service Update Management Assistant
 Vital Product Data (VPD)

References

External links
 IBM AIX

IBM operating systems
Power ISA operating systems
PowerPC operating systems
IBM Aix
Object-oriented database management systems
1986 software